The anterior cecal artery (or anterior caecal artery) is a branch of the ileocolic artery which supplies the anterior region of the cecum.

References

External links
  - "Intestines and Pancreas: Branches of Superior Mesenteric Artery"

Arteries of the abdomen